The RIM-67 Standard ER (SM-1ER/SM-2ER) is an extended range surface-to-air missile (SAM) and anti-ship missile originally developed for the United States Navy (USN). The RIM-67 was developed as a replacement for the RIM-8 Talos, a 1950s system deployed on a variety of USN ships, and eventually replaced the RIM-2 Terrier as well, since it was of a similar size and fitted existing Terrier launchers and magazines. The RIM-66 Standard MR was essentially the same missile without the booster stage, designed to replace the RIM-24 Tartar. The RIM-66/67 series thus became the US Navy's universal SAM system, hence the "Standard Missile" moniker.

RIM-67A SM-1 Extended Range 
The RIM-67A (SM-1ER Block I) was the Navy's replacement for RIM-8 Talos missile. Improved technology allowed the RIM-67 to be reduced to the size of the earlier RIM-2 Terrier missile. Existing ships with the Mk86 guided missile fire control system, or "Terrier" were adapted to employ the new missile in place of the older RIM-2 Terrier missile. Ships that switched from the RIM-2 Terrier to the RIM-67A were still referred to as Terrier ships even though they were equipped with the newer missile.

RIM-67B and RIM-156 SM-2 Extended Range 

The second generation of Standard missile, the Standard Missile 2, was developed for the Aegis combat system, and New Threat Upgrade program that was planned for existing Terrier and Tartar ships. The destroyer  served as the test platform for the development of the CG/SM-2 (ER) missile program project. The principal change over the Standard missile 1 is the introduction of inertial guidance for each phase of the missile's flight except the terminal phase where semi-active homing was retained. This design change was made so that missiles could time share illumination radars and enable equipped ships to defend against saturation missile attacks.

Terrier ships reequipped as part of the New Threat Upgrade were refit to operate the RIM-67B (SM-2ER Block II) missile. However, Aegis ships were not equipped with launchers that had space enough for the longer RIM-67B.

The Mk72 booster allows the RIM-156A to fit into the Mark 41 Vertical Launching System. This configuration can also be used for Terminal phase Ballistic Missile Defense.

There was a plan to build a nuclear armed standard missile mounting a W81 nuclear warhead as a replacement for the earlier Nuclear Terrier missile (RIM-2D). The USN rescinded the requirement for the nuclear armed missile in the 1980s, and the project was canceled.

The Standard can also be used against ships, either at line-of-sight range using its semi-active homing mode, or over the horizon using inertial guidance and terminal infrared homing.

RIM-174 Standard Missile 6 ERAM is a new generation of Standard extended range missiles, which became operational in 2013.

Operational history
During the Iran–Iraq War (1980–1988) the United States deployed Standard missiles to protect its navy, as well as other ships in the Persian Gulf from the threat of Iranian attacks. According to the Iranian Air Force, its F-4 Phantom IIs were engaged by SM-2ERs but managed to evade them, with one aircraft sustaining non-fatal damage due to shrapnel. During the same war the United States Navy mistakenly shot down an Iranian civilian airliner, Iran Air Flight 655 using two SM-2 missiles.

The attacks destroyed the Iranian ship's superstructure but did not sink it.

An 18 July 2015 test firing damaged the destroyer , restricting the older SM-2s to wartime use only.

Deployment

RIM-67 Standard was deployed on ships of the following classes, replacing the RIM-2 Terrier, and it never was VLS-capable. All of the ships used the AN/SPG-55 for guidance. The Mk10 guided missile launching system was used as the launching system. New Threat Upgrade equipped vessels operated the RIM-67B which used inertial guidance for every phase of the intercept except for the terminal phase where the AN/SPG-55 radar illuminates the target.

 SM-1ER later SM-2ER with NTU.
Farragut-class destroyers SM-1ER later SM-2ER with NTU ( only).
s SM-1ER later SM-2ER with NTU.
 SM-1ER later SM-2ER with NTU.
s SM-1ER later SM-2ER with NTU.
 SM-1ER later SM-2ER with NTU.
 SM-1ER Only.

The RIM-156 Standard Block IV, is a version that has been developed for Aegis Combat System it has a smaller compact sized booster stage for firing from the Mk41 Guided missile launch system. Like the earlier RIM-67B it employs inertial/command guidance with terminal semi-active homing.
s (VLS units only)
s

The RIM-174 Standard ERAM or Standard Missile Six has superseded the RIM-156A in production. The RIM-156A remains in service as of 2010.

RIM-67 Standard missiles have been withdrawn from service, remaining rounds are being re-manufactured in to GQM-163 Coyote supersonic targets.

Variants

Gallery

See also
RIM-2 Terrier – predecessor
RIM-8 Talos – predecessor
RIM-24 Tartar
AGM-78 Standard ARM
RIM-66 Standard Medium Range
RIM-161 Standard SM-3
RIM-174 Standard ERAM – successor

References

External links 

Raytheon Standard missile website, mfr of Standard missiles
Designation systems.net - RIM-67
FAS - SM-2ER
GlobalSecurity.org - SM-2
Navweaps.com

RIM067
RIM067
RIM067
RIM067
RIM067
Military equipment introduced in the 1980s